The Australian and New Zealand Journal of Family Therapy is a quarterly peer-reviewed academic journal published by Wiley-Blackwell on behalf of the Australian Association of Family Therapy. The journal was established in 1979. It covers research related to family therapy, spanning subfields of psychology such as clinical psychology, therapy, counseling, and psychoanalysis.

Abstract and indexing
The journal is abstracted or indexed in:
CINAHL
EBSCO databases
ProQuest databases
PsycINFO
Scopus
Social Sciences Citation Index

According to the Journal Citation Reports, the journal has a 2017 impact factor of 0.575, ranking it 37th out of 46 journals in the category "Family Studies" and 706th out of 774 journals in the category "Psychiatry/Psychology".

References

External links

Wiley-Blackwell academic journals
English-language journals
Publications established in 1979
Quarterly journals
Clinical psychology journals
Psychotherapy journals